Abel Serdio Guntín (born 16 April 1994) is a Spanish handball player for Wisła Płock and the Spanish national team.

References

1994 births
Living people
People from Avilés
Spanish male handball players
Liga ASOBAL players
FC Barcelona Handbol players
Wisła Płock (handball) players
21st-century Spanish people